"Saved My Life" is a song performed by Sia. The song was released on 2 May 2020, after she performed it during the online COVID Is No Joke live comedy fest hosted by AmeriCares during the COVID-19 pandemic. The proceeds from the song benefit AmeriCares and CORE Response. It is featured on Sia's album Music – Songs from and Inspired by the Motion Picture, released in February 2021.

Sia revealed in an interview with Zach Sang that "Saved My Life" came out of a writing session she did with Dua Lipa.

Lyrically, the song is about her friend saving her from suicide in 2016.

Composition
Written by Sia, frequent collaborator Greg Kurstin and British singer-songwriter Dua Lipa, "Saved My Life" is a pop ballad which features piano, keyboards, bass, drums and guitar played by Kurstin. The track opens up as a piano ballad and slowly builds into a grand track filled with strings and an uptempo beat. Sia's vocal performance on the track was described as "passionate" by mxdwn. "Saved My Life" has a length of three minutes and fifty-five seconds.

Credits and personnel
Credits adapted from Tidal.
 Sia – writer, vocals
 Dua Lipa – writer
 Greg Kurstin – writer, producer, bass, drums, guitar, keyboards, piano, programming, engineer, mixer, masterer
 Julian Burg – engineer
 Chris Gehringer – masterer

Charts

References

2020s ballads
2020 songs
2020 singles
Charity singles
Pop ballads
Sia (musician) songs
Song recordings produced by Greg Kurstin
Songs written by Dua Lipa
Songs written by Greg Kurstin
Songs written by Sia (musician)
Atlantic Records singles